Jakob Gartner (6 October 1861 in Přerov – 15 April 1921 in Vienna) was an Austrian Jewish architect.

Life 
Gartner was born on 6 October 1861. He was born into a Jewish family with five children. He studied in Brno, and then worked as an internwith other architects in Bielitz and Vienna. In 1888 he became independent and designed several dwellings and a synagogue. He died on 15 April 1921 in Vienna. He was laid to rest in Döbling.

Gartner designed several synagogues in historic Hungary, including Debrecen, Trnava (now Slovakia), Galgoc (today Slovakia), and Târgu Mureş (today Romania). He was probably also the designer of the synagogue at the Újpest Synagogue in Budapest.

Some of its buildings were later destroyed in the framework of the National Socialist pogroms.

He was married to Anna Lanzer.

Buildings 
     1885–1886: Újpest Synagogue, Budapest (presumption)
     1889: Pilsen Synagogue
     1890: Galgóczi Synagogue
     1892–1893: Holešov Synagogue
     1892–1896 Opava Synagogue, destroyed in 1938
     1894: Debrecen Neological Synagogue
     1895–1897: Olmütz Synagogue, destroyed in 1939
     1896: Humboldtgasse Synagogue, Vienna, Humboldtgasse 27, died in 1938
     1897: "Zu drei Hähnen" Residential and commercial building, Brno
     1891: Synagogue in Trnava
     1898: Apartment house, Vienna, Alsergrund, Borschkegasse 8
     1898: Kluckygasse Synagogue, Vienna, Kluckygasse 11, destroyed in 1938
     1898: Prerau Synagogue
     1898: Simmeringer Synagogue, Vienna, Braunhubergasse 7, destroyed in 1938
     1899–1900: The Târgu Mureş Synagogue
     1899–1901: Queen Elizabeth's Birthplace, Knöllgasse 22-24 Vienna
     1900–1901: Orlová Synagogue
     1901: Apartment house, Vienna, Wieden, Johann-Strauß-Gasse 32
     1901–1902: Residential building, Vienna, Josefstadt, Albertgasse 36
     1901–1904: Prostějov Synagogue
     1902: Residential building, Vienna, Innere Stadt, Biberstraße 4
     1902: Residential, office and commercial building, Vienna, Innere Stadt, Stubenring 24
     1904–1905: Residential and business house, Vienna, Stubenring 14
     1905: Residential and business house, Vienna, Stubenring 2
     1906: Apartment house, Vienna, Landstraße, Dapontegasse 4
     1906–1907: Apartment House, Vienna, Mariahilf, Theoboldgasse 16
     1907–1908: Siebenbrunnengasse Synagogue or Jubiläumstempel, Vienna, Margareten, Siebenbrunnengasse 1, destroyed in 1938
     1908–1910: Kroměříž Synagogue
     1910: Wohn- und Geschäftshaus, Vienna

Gallery

References

1861 births
1921 deaths
Austrian Jews
Austrian architects
Jewish architects
Synagogue architecture
People from Přerov
Moravian Jews